FC Torpedo-ZIL was a Russian association football club from Moscow. The club, however, should not be confused with the former Russian Premier League club FC Torpedo-ZIL, renamed "Torpedo-Metallurg" in 2003 (the club that later served as a base for the creation of FC Moscow). It was founded in 2003 under the name FC Torpedo-ZIL and was known as Torpedo-RG Moscow until 2009 when it was renamed back to Torpedo-ZIL. On April 3, 2009, ZiL bought FC Torpedo Moscow from their previous owner, Luzhniki. It was speculated at the time that the two teams could possibly be merged (ZiL was a minority owner in FC Torpedo-ZIL as of early 2009, with majority interest owned by Alexander Mamut). As deadline for 2009 registration passed, FC Torpedo Moscow was not reinstated in the Second Division and Torpedo-ZIL remained the only professional Torpedo for 2009.

In early 2011, after FC Saturn Moscow Oblast dropped out of the Russian Premier League for financial reasons, its place was taken up by FC Krasnodar, creating a vacancy in the Russian First Division. Torpedo-ZIL applied for the spot. After it was announced the spot will be awarded to FC Fakel Voronezh, Torpedo-ZIL owner Alexander Mamut announced that Torpedo-ZIL will be disbanded.

History
The club was founded as a joint foundation by the Russian newspaper "Rossiyskaya Gazeta" and the automobile plant "ZIL", the company that previously owned FC Torpedo-ZIL. The club started in the local regional Moscow championship, but was eventually promoted to the Russian Second Division.

External links
Official website

References

Defunct football clubs in Moscow
Association football clubs established in 2003
Association football clubs disestablished in 2011
2003 establishments in Russia
2011 disestablishments in Russia